Mika G. Yamaji (born January 3, 1978) is a film director, screenwriter, poet and author. Mika graduated from Brown University with a double major in Economics and English Literature. At Brown, Mika wrote and directed her first play, Glock 17. Upon graduation, Mika wrote, directed and two short films in Tokyo with sponsorship from Nikkatsu Studios.

Mentored by avant garde Japanese film director Toyoda Toshiaki, Mika worked with veteran cinematographer Yasushi Sasakibara and lighting director Hideyuki Yasukochi, editor Kusakabe Mototaka and producer Kikuchi Miyoshi.

Mika started Big Bully Films, a film production company, in May 2008.

Mika was also one of the recipients of MDA's Feature Film Fund

Mika published her first collection of poetry, 86 Benevolent Street in 2010 with the support of a grant from National Arts Council of Singapore.

Mika enjoys fishing and single malt scotch.

Books
 86 Benevolent Street (Firstfruits, 2010)

Filmography 

Short Films

On the Condition (2002) (digital, 18 min.)
The Perfect Afternoon (2003) (35mm, 10 min.)
Dreams of a Cafe (2009) (16mm, 3 min.)
Cherry Red (2009) (HD, 16 min.)
Hanging Gardens (2010) (Canon 5D Mark II HD, 12 min.)

Screenplays
Glock 17
London Town
Koi
Sweet Crude Oil
Watch My A** (with Sean McCully)

References

External links 
 Koi Official Movie Site
 Big Bully Films Site
 Showreel

Brown University alumni
Japanese film directors
1978 births
Living people